The award for MuchMusic.com Most Watched Video is an award presented at the MuchMusic Video Awards. The award is presented to an artist whose music video had the most views on the MuchMusic website. The award was first handed out at the 2008 MuchMusic Video Awards.

Winners

MuchMusic Video Awards